Senator Burney may refer to:

Charles O. Burney Jr. (1907–1972), New York State Senate
Dwight W. Burney (1892–1987), Nebraska State Senate